The National Alliance was an Australian political party of the early 1970s. The party was formed in Western Australia (WA) as a short-lived merger between the WA Country Party and WA Democratic Labor Party (DLP).

The party stood on a centrist platform as the "National Alliance" in both the March 1974 state election and the May 1974 federal election. It contested most of the state seats and every federal seat, standing in many metropolitan seats for the first time. At the Western Australian state election, National Alliance won more than 8.5% of the primary vote. At the 1974 federal election it won 10.7% of the primary vote in WA, but lost the Country Party's last two seats in the House of Representatives and one of its Senate seats, winning only a single Senate seat for incumbent Tom Drake-Brockman. However, in both elections the party lost votes and seats compared to the combined performance of its component parties in previous elections.

The Alliance was dissolved soon afterwards and the constituent parties reverted to their previous separate existence. The Country Party rebranded itself as the National Country Party and Senator Drake-Brockman continued to sit as its member, leading the party in the Senate. It reverted to its traditional approach of contesting just rural seats. In the 1977 federal election, Drake-Brockman retired and his seat was lost. As at 2018, he is the last member of what is now the National Party to be elected to the Senate from Western Australia.

References

Defunct political parties in Australia
National Party of Australia